Sentinel Island may refer to:

 Sentinel Island (Tasmania), Australia
 Sentinel Island (Alaska), location of the Sentinel Island Light lighthouse
 Sentinel Island (Washington), one of the San Juan Islands, U.S.
 North Sentinel Island, part of the Andaman Islands, India, and home to the isolated Sentinelese
 South Sentinel Island, part of the Andaman Islands, India